The Iraqi dinar (Arabic: دينار; sign: ID in Latin, د.ع in Arabic; code: IQD) is the currency of Iraq. It is issued by the Central Bank of Iraq and is subdivided into 1,000 fils (فلس), although inflation has rendered the fils obsolete since 1990. On 7 February 2023, the exchange rate with the US Dollar was US$1 = 1300 dinars.

History
The Iraqi dinar entered circulation on 1 April 1932, replacing the Indian rupee, which had been the official currency since the British occupation of the country in World War I, at a rate of 1 dinar = 11 rupees. The dinar was pegged at par with sterling until 1959 when, without changing its value, the peg was switched to the United States dollar at the rate of ID 1 = US$2.80. By not following the US devaluations in 1971 and 1973, the official rate rose to US$3.3778, before a 5% devaluation reduced its rate to US$3.2169, a rate which remained until the Gulf War in 1990, although in late 1989 the black market rate was reported at five to six times higher than the official rate.

Post-1990 developments 
After the Gulf War in 1990, due to UN sanctions, Iraq was no longer able to place orders with De La Rue for further issues of the previously high quality notes, so new notes were produced. The pre-1990 notes became known as the “Swiss dinars” while the new dinar notes were called “Saddam dinars”. Due to United States and the international sanctions on Iraq along with excessive government printing, the Saddam dinar currency devalued quickly. By late 1995, US$1 was valued at ID 3,000 on the black market.

Swiss dinars notes continued to circulate in the politically isolated Kurdish regions of Iraq. The Kurdish government refused to accept the low quality Saddam dinar notes (which were issued in huge amounts). Since the supply of Saddam dinar notes increased while the supply of Swiss dinar notes remained stable (even decreased because of notes taken out of circulation), the Swiss dinar notes appreciated against the Saddam dinar note. By having its own stable currency, the northern part of Iraq effectively evaded inflation, which ran rampant throughout the rest of the country.

After Saddam Hussein was deposed in the 2003 invasion of Iraq, the Iraqi Governing Council and the Office for Reconstruction and Humanitarian Assistance printed more Saddam dinar notes as a stopgap measure to maintain the money supply until a new currency could be introduced.

Between 15 October 2003 and 15 January 2004, the Coalition Provisional Authority issued new Iraqi dinar notes and coins, with the notes printed by the British security printing firm De La Rue using modern anti-forgery techniques to "create a single unified currency that is used throughout all of Iraq and will also make money more convenient to use in people's everyday lives". Multiple trillions of dinars were shipped to Iraq and secured in the Central Bank to exchange for Saddam dinar notes. Saddam dinar notes were exchanged for the new dinars at par, while Swiss dinar notes were exchanged at a rate of one Swiss dinar = 150 new dinars.

Inflation and depreciation of the currency has continued since. On 19 December 2020, Iraq's Central Bank devalued the dinar by 24% to improve the government's revenue, which was affected by the COVID-19 pandemic and low oil prices. On 2 March 2019, the Central Bank's indicative exchange rate was ID 1,190 = US$1. and on 18 June 2021 it was ID 1,460.5000 = US$1.

There is considerable confusion (perhaps intentional on the part of dinar sellers) around the role of the International Monetary Fund in Iraq. The IMF as part of the rebuilding of Iraq is monitoring Iraq's finances and for this purpose uses a single rate (not a sell/buy) of ID 1170 per US$. This "program rate" is used for calculations in the IMF monitoring program and is not a rate imposed on Iraq by the IMF. For a wider history surrounding currency in the region, see British currency in the Middle East.

Use in speculation and fraud since the Iraq war (2003–present) 
Since Iraq has few exports other than oil, which is sold in dollars, there is little international demand for dinars, resulting in an extremely high exchange rate compared with other currencies.

However, the downfall of Saddam Hussein resulted in the development of a multi-million-dollar industry involving the sale of dinars to speculators. Such exchange services and companies sell dinars at an inflated price, pushing the idea that the dinar would sharply increase in value to a profitable exchange rate some time in the future, instead of being redenominated. This activity can be either a legitimate service to currency speculators, or foreign exchange fraud: at least one major such currency exchange provider was convicted of fraud involving the dinar. This trade revived after the election of Donald Trump in November 2016, with many buyers believing that Trump would cause a sharp revaluation in the dinar (often referred to by the abbreviation "RV" by supporters of the dinar trade,) to an exchange rate comparable to the US dollar.

In 2014, Keith Woodwell (director of the Utah Division of Securities) and Mike Rothschild (writer for Skeptoid blog) stated that the speculation over the Iraqi dinar originated from a misunderstanding of why the value of the Kuwaiti dinar recovered after the First Gulf War, leading to an assumption that the Iraqi dinar would follow suit after the fall of Saddam: Woodwell and Rothschild noted substantial differences in economic and political stability between Iraq and Kuwait, with Iraq facing pervasive sectarian violence amid near-total reliance on oil exports.

In response to the growing concerns about fraud and scams related to investment in the Iraqi dinar, State agencies such as Washington State, Utah, Oklahoma, Alabama and others issued statements and releases warning potential investors. Further alerts were issued by news agencies.  These alerts usually warn potential investors that there is no place outside Iraq to exchange the dinar, that they are typically sold by dealers at inflated prices, and that there is little evidence to substantiate the claims of significant appreciation of their investment due to revaluation of the currency.

In February 2014, the Better Business Bureau included investing in the dinar as one of the ten most notable scams in 2013. There has also been a book written on the subject.

Coins
Coins were introduced in 1931 and 1932 in denominations of round 1 and 2 fils in bronze, and scalloped 4 and 10 fils in nickel. 20, 50, and 200 fils were 50% silver. The 200 fils coin is also known as a rial. Bronze substituted nickel in the 5 and 10 fils from 1938 to 1943 during the World War II period and reverted to nickel in 1953. Silver 100 fils coins were also introduced in 1953. These coins first depicted King Faisal I from 1931 to 1933, King Ghazi from 1938, and King Faisal II from 1943 until the end of the kingdom.

Following the establishment of the Iraqi Republic, a new series of coins was introduced in denominations of 1, 5, 10, 25, 50, and 100 fils, with the 25, 50, and 100 fils in silver until 1969. In this series an allegorical sun replaced the image of the king, shapes and sizes remained the same with the exception of the 1 fil which was decagon shaped. This image was then replaced by three palms in 1968. In 1970, 250 fils pieces were introduced, followed by 500 fils and ID 1 coins in 1982. A number of the coins for 1982 were a commemorative series celebrating Babylonian achievements. During this period, many of the coins were identified by their shape due to being made of similar composition metals, as from 1980 onward 250 fils were octagonal, 500 fils square, and ID 1 decagon shaped. Coin production ceased after 1990 due to the emergency conditions generated by the Gulf War and international sanctions.

In 2004, a new series of coins were issued in denominations of ID 25, ID 50 and ID 100 and were struck in bronze, brass, and nickel-plated steel respectively. They are sparse in design and depict an abstract map of Iraq and the main rivers.

Banknotes

The notes were printed in the United Kingdom by Bradbury, Wilkinson & Co. From 1932 to 1947, the banknotes were issued by the Iraqi currency board for the government of Iraq and banknotes were convertible into pound sterling. From 1947, the banknotes were issued by the National Bank of Iraq, then after 1954 by the Central Bank of Iraq.

100 dinars notes ceased production in the 1940s, however, the same denominations were used until 1978, when ID 25 notes were introduced. In 1991, ID 50 were introduced and ID 100 reintroduced, followed in 1995 by ID 250 notes and ID 10,000 notes in 2002.

Banknotes that were issued between 1990 and October 2003, along with an ID 25 note issued in 1986, bear an idealized engraving of former Iraqi President Saddam Hussein. Following the 1991 Gulf War, Iraq's currency was printed both locally and in China, using poor grade wood pulp paper (rather than cotton or linen) and inferior quality lithography (some notes were reputedly printed on presses designed for printing newspapers).

The primitive printing techniques resulted in a limitless variety in coloration and detail, one layer of the printing would be too faint while another would be too dark. Counterfeit banknotes often appeared to be of better quality than real notes. Some notes were very poorly cut, and some notes even lacked serial numbers. Despite the collapse in the value of the Iraqi dinar, the highest denomination printed until 2002 was ID 250. In 2002, the Central Bank of Iraq issued an ID 10,000 banknote to be used for "larger, and inter-bank transactions". This note was rarely accepted in practice due to fears of looting and counterfeiting. This forced people to carry around stacks of ID 250 note for everyday use. The other, smaller notes were so worthless that they largely fell into disuse. This situation meant that Iraq, for the most part, had only one denomination of currency in wide circulation.

Currency printed before the Gulf War was often called the Swiss dinar, a term of obscure and uncertain origins. These notes were manufactured in England by De La Rue and were of significantly higher quality than those later produced under the economic sanctions that were imposed after the first Gulf War. After a change-over period, this currency was unendorsed by the Iraqi government. However, this old currency still circulated in the Kurdish regions of Iraq until it was replaced with the new dinar after the second Gulf War. During this time the Swiss dinar retained its value, whilst the new currency consistently lost value at sometimes 30% per annum.

In 2003, new banknotes were issued consisting of six denominations: ID 50, ID 250, ID 1,000, ID 5,000, ID 10,000, and ID 25,000. The notes were similar in design to notes issued by the Central Bank of Iraq (CBI) in the 1970s and 1980s. An ID 500 note was issued a year later, in October 2004. In the Kurdish regions of Iraq, the ID 50 note is not in circulation.

In March 2014, the CBI began replacing banknotes with anti-counterfeiting enhanced versions that include SPARK optical security features, scanner readable guarantee threads in addition to braille embossing to assist vision-impaired persons.

In February 2015, the CBI announced the removal from circulation on 30 April 2015 of the ID 50 notes. Persons holding these banknotes were advised to immediately redeem them at their nearest bank for the ID 250 and higher denomination dinar notes at a one-to-one rate at no charge.

In November 2015, the CBI announced the introduction of a new ID 50,000 banknote. This is the first new denomination banknote since the new series was first issued in 2003, and also the largest ever printed by the CBI. The current notes no longer depict Saddam Hussein and now feature inscriptions in both Arabic and Kurdish. The banknotes are printed using new security features from Giesecke & Devrient & De La Rue and measure 156 × 65 mm.  They feature an outline map of Iraq showing the Euphrates & Tigris rivers as well as the Great Mosque of Samarra.

Kingdom of Iraq dinar series (1932–1939)

Swiss dinar series (1979–1986)

1990–2003 series

2003–present

Exchange rate

See also 
 British currency in the Middle East
 Central Bank of Iraq
 Economy of Iraq
 Iraqi art
 Iraqi Swiss dinar
 Kuwaiti dinar

References

External links 
 Central Bank of Iraq homepage
 Council on Foreign Relations: benefits of the new Iraqi dinar 
 Iraqi Dinar Scam – Washington State Department of Financial Institutions warning
 Iraqi Dinar Scams – Oklahoma Securities Commission warns residents
 Dmoztools.net – Iraqi Dinar 

Currencies of Iraq
Economy of Iraq
Currencies introduced in 1932